Sabir Ali (born 11 July 1991) is a Pakistani-born cricketer who plays for the United Arab Emirates national cricket team.

Personal life
Ali grew up in Lahore, Pakistan. He moved to the UAE in 2016.

Career
In August 2022, he was named in UAE's One Day International squad for the  Tri-Nation series, which was formed part of the 2019–2023 ICC Cricket World Cup League 2. He made his ODI debut for United Arab Emirates against Scotland on 10 August 2022.

In August 2022, he was named in UAE's national squad for the 2022 Asia Cup Qualifier. He made his Twenty20 International (T20I) debut for the United Arab Emirates against Singapore on 22 August 2022 in Asia Cup Qualifier.

References

External links
 

1991 births
Living people
Pakistani cricketers
United Arab Emirates Twenty20 International cricketers
United Arab Emirates One Day International cricketers
Pakistani expatriate sportspeople in the United Arab Emirates
People from Lahore